Isiah Williams was an American former college basketball player for Utah Valley University.  Williams was the Great West Conference player of the year in 2011 and UVU's first division I All-American in basketball.

Williams, a 6'1" guard from Farragut High School in Chicago, Illinois, played two years of junior college ball at the College of Eastern Utah, where he led the Golden Eagles to a third-place finish in the 2010 NJCAA Men's Division I Basketball Championship.  He then moved to Utah Valley University to play for Dick Hunsaker and complete his four-year degree.

In his junior season of 2010–11, Williams averaged 17.4 points and 1.8 assists per game as he led the Wolverines to an 11–1 finish and a Great West Conference regular-season championship. Williams was named first team All-Conference and Conference player of the year.  At the conclusion of the season, Williams was named an Associated Press honorable mention All-American, making him the first player in school history to receive such an honor.

In 2011–12, Williams was chosen to repeat as the preseason GWC player of the year by a vote of the league's coaches.

References

External links 
 Utah Valley Wolverines bio

Place of birth missing (living people)
Year of birth missing (living people)
Living people
American men's basketball players
Basketball players from Chicago
Point guards
Utah State Eastern Golden Eagles men's basketball players
Utah Valley Wolverines men's basketball players